A league is a unit of length. It was common in Europe and Latin America, but is no longer an official unit in any nation. Derived from an ancient Celtic unit and adopted by the Romans as the leuga, the league became a common unit of measurement throughout western Europe. It may have originally represented, roughly, the distance a person could walk in an hour. Since the Middle Ages, many values have been specified in several countries.

Different definitions

Ancient Rome 

The league was used in Ancient Rome, defined as 1½ Roman miles (7,500 Roman feet, modern 2.2 km or 1.4 miles). The origin is the leuga Gallica (also: leuca Callica), the league of Gaul.

Argentina 

England 

On land, the league is most commonly defined as three miles (4.83 km), though the length of a mile could vary from place to place and depending on the era. English usage also included many of the other leagues mentioned below (for example, in discussing the Treaty of Tordesillas).

France 

It was used along with the metric system for a while, but is long discontinued.

A metric lieue was used in France from 1812 to 1840, with 1 metric lieue being exactly 4,000 m, or 4 km (about 2.5 mi). It is this unit that is referenced in both the title and the body text of Jules Verne's novel Twenty Thousand Leagues Under the Seas (1870).

Mexico 

Perhaps in some rural parts of Mexico, the league (Spanish legua) is still used in the original sense of the distance that can be covered on foot in an hour, so that a league along a good road on level ground is a greater distance than a league on a difficult path over rough terrain.

Portugal 

In Portugal, Brazil and other parts of the former Portuguese Empire, there were several units called league (Portuguese: légua):
 Légua of 18 to a degree = 6,172.84 metres
 Légua of 20 to a degree (Maritime légua) = 5,555.56 metres 
 Légua of 25 to a degree = 4,444.44 metres

The names of the several léguas referred to the number of units that made the length corresponding to an angle degree of a meridian arc.

As a transitory measure, after Portugal adopted the metric system, the metric légua, of 5.0 km, was used.

In Brazil, the légua is still used occasionally, where it has been described as about 6.6 km.

Spain 

This varied depending on local standards for the pie (Spanish foot) and on the precision of measurement, but was officially equivalent to  (2.6 miles) before the legua was abolished by Philip II in 1568. It remains in use in parts of Latin America, where its exact meaning varies.
 Legua nautica (nautical league): Between 1400 and 1600 the Spanish nautical league was equal to four Roman miles of 4,842 feet, making it 19,368 feet (5,903 metres or 3.1876 modern nautical miles). However, the accepted number of Spanish nautical leagues to a degree varied between 14 1/6 to 16 2/3, so in actual practice the length of a Spanish nautical league was 25,733 feet (4.235 modern nautical miles) to 21,874 feet (3.600 modern nautical miles) respectively.
 Legua de por grado (league of the degree): From the 15th century through the early 17th century, the Spanish league of the degree was based on four Arabic miles. Although most contemporary accounts used an Arabic mile of 6 444 feet (1,964 metres), which gave a Spanish league of the degree of 25,776 feet (7,857 metres or 4.242 modern nautical miles) others defined an Arabic mile as just 6,000 feet making a Spanish league of the degree 24,000 feet (or 7,315 metres, almost exactly 3.95 modern nautical miles).
 Legua geographica or geográfica (geographical league): Starting around 1630 the Spanish geographical league was used as the official nautical measurement and continued so through the 1840s. Its use on Spanish charts did not become mandatory until 1718. It was four millias (miles) in length. From 1630 to 1718 a millia was 5,564 feet (1 696 metres), making a geographical league of four millias equal 22,256 feet (6,784 m or 3.663 modern nautical miles). But from 1718 through the 1830s the millia was defined as the equivalent of just over 5,210 feet, giving a shorter geographical league of just over 20,842 feet (6,353 m or 3.430 modern nautical miles).
 Legua marítima (maritime league): From around 1840 through the early 20th century, a Spanish marine league equaled 18,263.52 feet (5,566.72 metres or 3.00579 modern nautical miles).

In the early Hispanic settlements of New Mexico, Texas, California, and Colorado, a league was also a unit of area, defined as 25 million square varas or about 4,428.4 acres. This usage of league is referenced frequently in the Texas Constitution. So defined, a league of land would encompass a square that is one Spanish league on each side.

Comparison table 

A comparison of the different lengths for a "league", in different countries and at different times in history, is given in the table below. Miles are also included in this list because of the linkage between the two units.

Similar units:
 1,066.8 metres – verst, see also Obsolete Russian units of measurement
 3,200 metres – kosh, used in North Bihar, India.

See also 
 Medieval weights and measures for various definitions of the league.
 List of obsolete units of measurement
 Portuguese customary units
 Spanish customary units
 Seven-league boots
 Walking
 Parasang

References 

Obsolete units of measurement
Units of length
Human-based units of measurement
Imperial units
Customary units of measurement in the United States